Mitchell Petroglyph Archeological Site, also known as the Missouri Archeological Survey Number 23RN1 , is a historic archaeological site located near Cairo, Randolph County, Missouri. The site was documented during 1944, and includes petroglyphs identified as a full-tailed thunderbird, a large human-like figure and several thunderbirds, male and female sexual motifs, and shaman or human-like spirit.

It was listed on the National Register of Historic Places in 1969.

References

Archaeological sites on the National Register of Historic Places in Missouri
Buildings and structures in Randolph County, Missouri
National Register of Historic Places in Randolph County, Missouri